Roy Eugene Williams Jr. (born December 20, 1981) is an American former professional football player who was a wide receiver in the National Football League (NFL) for the Detroit Lions, Dallas Cowboys, and Chicago Bears. He played college football for the Texas Longhorns.

Early years
Williams attended high school at Permian High School in Odessa, Texas, where he starred in multiple sports. He lettered in football, track, baseball, and basketball, earning all-state honors in football and track and all-district accolades in baseball and basketball.

Williams also made the honor roll all four years while attending Permian High School.

College career
Arriving at the University of Texas in the 2000 recruiting class, Williams and fellow freshmen receivers BJ Johnson and Sloan Thomas were touted as the most talented group of incoming receivers in school history.

In his second season, he started 13 games, making 67 receptions for 836 yards and 7 touchdowns. As a junior, he was limited with a hamstring injury, appearing in 12 games with nine starts, while posting 64 receptions for 1,142 yards and 12 touchdowns. Instead of opting for the NFL, he decided to return for his senior season, registering 70 receptions for 1,079 yards and 9 touchdowns.

By the end of his college career, Williams had become one of the most decorated receivers in Texas Longhorns history. Nicknamed "The Legend", he left school as the all-time leader in receptions, receiving yards, and receiving touchdowns. He was a member of the All-Conference Team for the Big 12 on three occasions, and was a semi-finalist for the Biletnikoff Award during both his junior and senior seasons.

In 2013, he was inducted into the University of Texas Hall of Honor.

Track and field
Williams was a track star at the University of Texas, where he recorded a personal best of 10.30 seconds in the 100 meters. He also specialized in high jump and long jump.

Personal bests

NFL career

2004 NFL Draft
Williams was selected seventh overall in the first round of the 2004 NFL Draft by the Detroit Lions. Many draft experts considered the pick a bold move since the Lions had drafted Charles Rogers with the second overall pick the year before.

2004 NFL Combine

Detroit Lions
In 2004, Williams set Lions rookie records with 54 receptions for 817 yards and eight touchdowns in 12 games; he suffered an ankle injury midway through the season that limited his effectiveness.

The following season, the team spent their first-round draft pick (10th overall) on yet another receiver, this time USC star Mike Williams. He finished first on the team in receiving yards (687), average per catch (15.3) and second in receptions (45).

Roy Williams had a productive year for the 2006 Lions, with 1,310 yards, seven touchdowns and a 16.0 yards-per-catch average. The 1,310 yards were the most in the NFC, and tied with Indianapolis Colts receiver Reggie Wayne for third-most in the NFL. Williams' 16.0  YPC average was first in the NFL for receivers with more than 25 receptions. He also had 24 catches of 20-plus yards, which ranked first in the NFL. He and teammate Mike Furrey caught more passes (178) than any other duo in the NFC. Williams was named an alternate for the 2007 Pro Bowl. When Torry Holt withdrew due to injury, Williams was named to the active squad. He was the first Detroit wide receiver to make the Pro Bowl since 1998 (Herman Moore). Williams was the 2007 recipient of the Detroit Lions/Detroit Sports Broadcasters Association/Pro Football Writers Association's Media-Friendly "Good Guy" Award. The Good Guy Award is given yearly to the Detroit Lions player who shows consideration to, and cooperation with the media at all times during the course of the season.

Dallas Cowboys
The Dallas Cowboys had tried to obtain Williams for two years, finally reaching a trade agreement with the Lions on October 14, 2008, in exchange for a first (#20-Brandon Pettigrew), third  (#82-Derrick Williams), and sixth-round (#192-Aaron Brown) picks in the 2009 NFL Draft (the Cowboys also received a seventh-round pick (#210-Vance Walker) from the Lions in the 2010 draft). He was then signed to a new contract through the 2014 season; he agreed to a six-year, $54 million contract, with $26 million guaranteed. Williams became the second option at wide receiver, while playing opposite to Terrell Owens and didn't have the immediate impact that it was expected, catching only 19 passes and one touchdown in seven starts, although his problems were attributed to his unfamiliarity with the offensive system, playing with two different quarterbacks and the lingering effects of a Lisfranc injury.

In 2009, with the release of Owens, Williams was expected to take over as the team's leading wide receiver, but against the Kansas City Chiefs, as a replacement for the injured Williams, Miles Austin had a breakout game with 10 receptions for 250 yards (a Cowboys record for receiving yards in a single-game, breaking Bob Hayes' 246-yard effort in 1966) and 2 touchdowns. Williams would be again relegated to the second wide receiver role for the rest of the season, although he helped the Cowboys win their first playoff game since 1996, by making five catches for 59 yards including several crucial third-down catches in the first half.

In 2010, the Cowboys drafted future Pro Bowler Dez Bryant in the first round, but Williams retained his starting role alongside Austin. He got off to a quick start with 21 receptions for 306 yards and 5 touchdowns in the first 5 games, but his production declined significantly in his final 10 games (16 catches for 224 yards and no touchdowns) as Bryant gained a bigger role in the offense. His best game with the Cowboys was against in-state rival Houston Texans, in which he recorded 117 receiving yards and two touchdowns on five catches while only being targeted six times.

His time with Cowboys was a disappointment, by the close of the 2010 season, Williams had totaled 99 regular season/playoff catches for the Cowboys and 13 touchdowns, 11 of which came from inside the red zone. He was released on July 28, 2011.

Chicago Bears
In 2011, a day after being released by the Cowboys, Williams agreed to sign with the Chicago Bears for a one-year, $2.46 million contract, reuniting with offensive coordinator Mike Martz, who held the same title with the Lions during Williams' Pro Bowl season. He finished with 37 receptions for 507 yards and 2 touchdowns, with his best game coming on Christmas night against the Green Bay Packers with six catches for 81 yards.

Williams announced his retirement from the NFL on his Facebook page on September 8, 2012.

NFL career statistics
Receiving statistics

Rushing statistics

Personal life
Upon retirement, Roy Williams returned to his home town of Odessa, Texas, where he started an oil field trucking company tapping into the boom going on in West Texas.

Williams played a small role in the 2004 sports film Friday Night Lights (his older brother, Lloyd Hill was on the team the movie was based on).  Williams played the role of an assistant coach for Midland Lee High School, which is one of Permian's biggest rivals. His one spoken line in the film was, "He ain’t going to play." Williams is also the co-founder, with college teammate BJ Johnson, of MVP Vodka, an All-American Wheat vodka made in Dallas, TX.

His older brother Lloyd Hill, was the Texas Tech University all-time leading receiver and led the NCAA in receptions in 1992.

References

External links
 
 

1981 births
Living people
American football wide receivers
Chicago Bears players
Dallas Cowboys players
Detroit Lions players
National Conference Pro Bowl players
People from Odessa, Texas
Permian High School alumni
Players of American football from Texas
Texas Longhorns football players